Sarah Margaret Steedman (1905 – 6 October 1975), née Wilson, was a Scottish chess master. She was a four-times winner the Scottish Women's Chess Championship.

Biography
From the 1950s to the 1960s, Peggy Steedman was one of Scotland's strongest female chess players. She four times won the Scottish Women's Chess Championships: 1951, 1956 (jointly), 1959 and 1969 (jointly).

Peggy Steedman played for Scotland in the Women's Chess Olympiads:
 In 1957, at first board in the 1st Chess Olympiad (women) in Emmen (+0, =3, -8),
 In 1963, at first board in the 2nd Chess Olympiad (women) in Split (+1, =2, -11).

In the 1950s Peggy Steedman joined the British Ladies' Chess Association and was for many years Honorary Secretary and Vice President of this organisation. Also she was a founder member and President of the Lanarkshire Chess League.

References

External links

Peggy Steedman chess games at 365Chess.com

1905 births
1975 deaths
People from Kirkcudbright
Scottish female chess players